Stonewood may refer to:
 Stonewood, West Virginia
 Stonewood-Pentwood-Winston, Baltimore
 Stonewood Center, a shopping mall located in Downey, California, United States
 Stonewood, a common name for the tree species Callistemon salignus